Bobby Broom Plays for Monk is a 2009 album by jazz guitarist Bobby Broom.

The album consists of eight compositions by Thelonious Monk and two other songs associated with Monk's repertoire. Its cover art is an homage to the cover of Monk's Music and its famous wagon.

Track listing
All songs written by Thelonious Monk unless noted.

"Ask Me Now" – 5:15
"Evidence" – 4:17
"Ruby, My Dear" – 5:40
"In Walked Bud" – 5:53
"Lulu's Back In Town" (Al Dubin/Harry Warren) – 5:55
"Reflections" – 6:09
"Work" – 7:07
"Rhythm-a-Ning" – 4:57
"Bemsha Swing" – 6:27
"Smoke Gets in Your Eyes" (Otto Harbach/Jerome Kern) – 5:00

Personnel 
 Bobby Broom – guitar
 Kobie Watkins – drums
 Dennis Carroll – bass

Production
 Bobby Broom – producer
 Josh Richter – recording and mixing
 Allan Tucker – mastering
 Mark Sheldon – photos
John Bishop – cover design

References

2009 albums
Jazz albums by American artists
Jazz fusion albums by American artists